Robert Stanley "Bob" Kilby (23 September 1944 – 11 January 2009) was a British motorcycle speedway rider for the Swindon Robins, Oxford Rebels and Exeter Falcons.

Speedway career
From the start of his career in 1964 to its end in 1983, he rode some 2,226 times over 556 meetings, and amassed a total of 4,192 points. He was a member of the Robins' British League title-winning team of 1967. He died on 11 January 2009 at his home in Stratton St Margaret, Swindon.

His son, Lee, wrote a biography of his father "To the Heart of Kilb".

References

1944 births
2009 deaths
British speedway riders
English motorcycle racers
Sportspeople from Swindon
Swindon Robins riders
Exeter Falcons riders
Oxford Cheetahs riders
Deaths from cancer in England